Prostanthera semiteres is a species of flowering plant in the family Lamiaceae and is endemic to Western Australia. It is a small shrub with narrow egg-shaped leaves with the narrower end towards the base and pink or red flowers.

Description

Taxonomy
Prostanthera semiteres was first formally described in 1984 by Barry Conn in the Journal of the Adelaide Botanic Gardens from specimens collected near Campion by Robert Chinnock in 1976.

In the same journal, Conn described two subspecies and the names are accepted by the Australian Plant Census:

Distribution and habitat
This mintbush grows between granite rocks in the Avon Wheatbelt, Coolgardie and Mallee biogeographic regions of Western Australia.

Conservation status
Both subspecies of P. semiteres are classified as "not threatened" by the Government of Western Australia Department of Parks and Wildlife.

References

semiteres
Flora of Western Australia
Lamiales of Australia
Taxa named by Barry John Conn
Plants described in 1984